Hee is a village located in the Ringkøbing-Skjern Municipality, in the Central Denmark Region.

Hee Church, presumably erected in 1140's, is one of Denmark's most significant romanesque buildings.

Notable people
 The politician J. C. Christensen lived for many years in Hee until his death in 1930.

References 

Cities and towns in the Central Denmark Region
Ringkøbing-Skjern Municipality